This page lists the winners and nominees for the Soul Train Music Award for Best Song of the Year. The award was originally entitled Best R&B/Urban Contemporary Song of the Year and first awarded during the 1989 ceremony. It was later retitled to its current title in 1993, before being renamed again to R&B/Soul or Rap Song of the Year in 1995. The award was retired following the 1996 ceremony, seeing the separated categories for male, female and group artists returning in its place. The award returned in 2009, along with its current title.

Winners and nominees
Winners are listed first and highlighted in bold.

1980s

1990s

2000s

2010s

2020s

See also
 Soul Train Music Award for Best R&B/Soul Single – Male
 Soul Train Music Award for Best R&B/Soul Single – Female
 Soul Train Music Award for Best R&B/Soul Single – Group, Band or Duo

References

Soul Train Music Awards
Song awards